"Boom" is a song by American rapper Snoop Dogg  featuring fellow American rapper T-Pain. It serves as the second official single from the former's eleventh studio album Doggumentary. Produced by Scott Storch, it was leaked on March 4, 2011, and officially released on March 8, 2011, along with the video, which was produced by Dylan Brown.

This song with T-Pain is featured on the soundtrack for the video game Madden NFL 12.

Background
Produced by Scott Storch, "Boom" contains an interpolation from the 1980s hit "Situation" by Yazoo.

Chart performance
On March 19, 2011, "Boom" debuted on the Billboard Hot 100 at number 76 and on the Hot Digital Songs chart at number 53.

Charts

References

2011 singles
Snoop Dogg songs
T-Pain songs
Song recordings produced by Scott Storch
Songs written by Snoop Dogg
Songs written by Scott Storch
Songs written by T-Pain
Songs written by Vince Clarke